The Reform Party is a political party in Mauritius. The party is led by Roshi Bhadain, who had resigned from the parliament on the 23rd of June 2017, to bring in a new change in the Mauritian political arena.

References

External links 
 
 

 Political parties in Mauritius
 Political parties established in 2017